The 1792 United States presidential election in Connecticut took place between November 2 and December 5, 1792, as part of the 1792 United States presidential election. The state legislature chose nine members of the Electoral College, each of whom, under the provisions of the Constitution prior to the passage of the Twelfth Amendment, cast two votes for President.

Connecticut's nine electors each cast one vote for incumbent George Washington and one for incumbent Vice President John Adams.

See also
 United States presidential elections in Connecticut

References

Connecticut
1792
1792 Connecticut elections